WORO-DT (channel 13), branded on-air as TeleOro Canal 13, is an educational/religious independent television station licensed to Fajardo, Puerto Rico. United States. The station is owned by Grupo RTC under Puerto Rico's Roman Catholic Church - San Juan Archdiocese, WORO-DT's studios are located on Ave. Iturregui in Carolina, and its transmitter is located in the El Yunque National Forest.

History

A 25-year legal fight
On July 16, 1958, Continental Broadcasting Corporation, owner of radio station WHOA in San Juan, was awarded a construction permit to build channel 13 in Fajardo, the first television station to be licensed there. The new station, which took the call letters WSTE (unrelated to the current WSTE on channel 7), proposed a transmitter in the Sardinera neighborhood of Fajardo. Continental's primary stakeholder, Carmina Méndez de Miller, sold the construction permit three years later to WSTE-TV, Inc., receiving 20 percent of the new company's stock; the new company was owned by the Griffin-Leake group.

Under Griffin-Leake control, WSTE set its sights on more powerful facilities. On November 10, 1961, just days after consummating its purchase, WSTE-TV, Inc., filed to move the tower to El Yunque, from which it would put a signal into San Juan. The Federal Communications Commission initially awarded the grant in May 1962, but a group of objectors soon emerged to appeal the grant in the United States Court of Appeals for the District of Columbia Circuit. This group consisted of San Juan television stations WAPA-TV and WKAQ-TV, a consortium of mobile radio users, and San Juan's only UHF outlet, WTSJ-TV (channel 18), alleging potentially harmful interference, misrepresentations with the FCC, and potential harm to the development of UHF broadcasting. Two more site change amendments were made by WSTE in response to interference concerns to radar and aviation systems. However, these were not sufficient to cure the deficiencies, and in February 1968, the FCC rescinded the grant and designated WSTE's transmitter site application for hearing.

In 1972, the FCC denied the revised application, this time on technical grounds, because the proposed station would not have provided a city-grade signal to 100 percent of Fajardo, the city of license. WSTE-TV appealed to the court of appeals, proposing to add a UHF translator on channel 56 in order to fill in gaps in coverage in Fajardo. The FCC had found in a 1971 case that the island's rugged terrain had merited tempering of the application of its rules. After the court found in WSTE's favor in 1977 in large part due to the translator application, the FCC granted the application in 1979 and denied a petition for reconsideration by WAPA in 1980.

As an English-language station
On November 1, 1984, channel 13 finally appeared in Puerto Rico, under the new call letters WPRV-TV. The station, with facilities in Fajardo and the Río Piedras area of San Juan, was primarily an English-language outlet, affiliated with ABC and in the late 1980s and early 1990s with Fox (WUJA was the island's original Fox affiliate from 1986 to 1989).

WPRV-TV struggled financially throughout its history. In December 1987, it filed for Chapter 11 bankruptcy; the case was converted to Chapter 7 in 1989. The largest creditor of the television station, Ponce Federal Bank, was bypassed in favor of an attempt to sell channel 13 to Puerto Rico Family Channel, Inc. (PRFC). Problems soon emerged with the proposed buyer. The trustee appointed to manage the television station could not identify the principals of the buyer, and questions arose about its financial capacity; further, one of the representatives of the company, Norman González Chacón, was facing felony criminal charges that the court feared could jeopardize the license transfer. Amid the proceedings, channel 13 went silent on September 22, 1992.

Archdiocesan ownership
In March 1994, WPRV-TV was sold to the Archdiocese of San Juan, which was allowed to own the failing TV station alongside its AM and FM outlets. Channel 13 returned to the air on October 11, 1995 as "Teleoro", a Catholic television station under the management of Cardinal Luis Aponte Martinez. The call letters were changed to WORO-TV in 2006 to match the archdiocese's WORO (92.5 FM) serving San Juan.

In 2002, WORO-TV leased its prime time hours to local producer Angelo Medina for his sport programming block branded as "Deportes 13". During these hours, Deportes 13 transmit sport-related programming and events such as MLB, National Basketball Association (NBA), Liga de Voleibol Superior Masculino among others. The format was discontinued on May 13, 2007.

Singer, writer and producer Silverio Pérez had a variety show called Buenas Noches con Silverio (Good Night with Silverio).

In August 2008, TeleOro announced that the station would develop a news program titled "Hora Informativa". The program's goal is to cover local news as well as material that other channels consider "soft". Segments were led by Luis Penchi and José Ángel Cordero and covered controversial themes that might not be covered otherwise due to the station's religious focus. Today, WORO produces local news (branded as Noticias 13) weeknights at 6:00 and 11:00, as well as Saturday nights at 5:00 and Sunday afternoons at 4:00 p.m.

On September 20, 2017, in the aftermath of Hurricane Maria, WORO-DT was forced to go off the air, suffering damage to the station's building, transmitter and equipment. The station then broadcast as a subchannel of Hector Marcano's WWXY-LD on channel 38.3 until August 1, 2018. The station returned to the air on August 27, 2018 from a provisional antenna. On February 5, 2019, WORO-DT resumed full-power broadcasts from its new and powerful transmitter from the top of El Yunque, that covers the entire island. Repairs to the old transmitter equipment were made by the engineering department.

Digital television

Digital channels
The station's digital signal is multiplexed:

Analog-to-digital conversion

On February 17, 2009, WORO signed off its analog signal and completed its move to digital.

Local Programs produced by WORO-DT 
 Santa Misa
 Ábrete Corazón
 En Espíritu y Verdad
 Familia, Activa tu Fe
 Mente y Corazón 
 Aviva
 Alpha y Omega
 Ecclesia de Eucaristía
 Maria: Modelo de la Iglesia
 El Pan de la Palabra
 Mundo Natural
 Coronilla de la Divina Misericordia
 Shabum y su Tienda Mágica
 Aprendo con Shabum
 Noticias 13 (produced by Spanish Television News)
 Entre Lineas
 En Cuerpo y Alma
 Agenda Abierta
 Desde mi Cocina a Tu Corazón
 Contigo Siempre
 Más con Isamari
 Mi Gente
 De Que se Trata
 Reconstrucción Ideal
 Con la Música por Dentro
 Historias Deportivas
 Tu Salud Financiera
 Industria y Comercio en Acción

See also
Catholic television
Catholic television channels
Catholic television networks

References

External links 
Canal 13
Shabum TV

ORO-DT
Fajardo, Puerto Rico
Television channels and stations established in 1984
Religious television stations in the United States
Catholic television channels
Catholic Church in Puerto Rico
1984 establishments in Puerto Rico